The Last Enemy (Italian:L'ultima nemica) is a 1938 Italian drama film directed by Umberto Barbaro and starring Fosco Giachetti, María Denis and Guglielmo Sinaz.

Cast

References

Bibliography 
 Ben-Ghiat, Ruth. Fascist Modernities: Italy, 1922-1945. University of California Press, 2001. 
 Moliterno, Gino. The A to Z of Italian Cinema. Scarecrow Press, 2009.

External links 
 

1938 films
Italian drama films
Italian black-and-white films
1938 drama films
1930s Italian-language films
Films directed by Umberto Barbaro
1930s Italian films